Zeta Aurigae, or ζ Aurigae, is a binary star system in the northern  constellation of Auriga. Based upon parallax measurements made during the Hipparcos mission, this system is approximately  distant from the sun. It has a combined apparent visual magnitude of 3.75, which is bright enough to be seen with the naked eye.

The two components are designated Zeta Aurigae A (officially named Saclateni , an old misspelling of "Sadatoni") and B.

Nomenclature 

ζ Aurigae (Latinised to Zeta Aurigae) is the system's Bayer designation. The designations of the two components as ζ Aurigae A and B derive from the convention used by the Washington Multiplicity Catalog (WMC) for multiple star systems, and adopted by the International Astronomical Union (IAU).

The system bore the traditional names Haedus I (also Hoedus) and Sadatoni (rarely Saclateni). It was one of the two haedi (Latin: 'kids') of the she-goat Capella, the other being Haedus II, Eta Aurigae. The name Sadatoni is from the Arabic الساعد الثاني as-sācid aθ-θānī "the second arm (of the charioteer)". The rare traditional name Azaleh is shared (in the form Hassaleh) with Iota Aurigae. In 2016, the IAU organized a Working Group on Star Names (WGSN) to catalog and standardize proper names for stars. The WGSN decided to attribute proper names to individual stars rather than entire multiple systems. It approved the names Saclateni for the component Zeta Aurigae A and Haedus for Eta Aurigae on 30 June 2017 and they are both now so included in the List of IAU-approved Star Names.

Properties 

Zeta Aurigae was first recognized as a spectroscopic binary by William Hammond Wright while analyzing photographic plates taken at Lick Observatory between 1898 and 1908. This star is among those earlier described by Antonia Maury as having a composite spectrum. The first orbit was determined in 1924 by William Edmund Harper using measurements taken at Dominion Observatory, his orbital elements are very similar to the most recent determinations. Harper also noticed that the composite nature of the spectrum had disappeared on the one plate when the K type primary was nearest the sun indicating a possible eclipse. In 1932 the eclipsing binary nature of the system was confirmed by Paul Guthnick, Heribert Schneller and independently Josef Hopmann.

The orbital plane of this eclipsing system is oriented close to the line of sight from the Earth, with an inclination estimated as 87.0°. As a result, an eclipse of one star by the other occurs during each orbit, causing the net magnitude to decrease to +3.99. The primary, component A, has been categorized as a K-type bright giant or supergiant star. Its companion, component B, is a B-type main-sequence star with a stellar classification B5 V or B7 V. Because component B has a much hotter photosphere than component A, component B produces most of the system's ultraviolet light. This causes the brightness change seen during the eclipses (when B is obscured) to be much greater in ultraviolet light than it is in visible light.

References

External links
 HR 1612
 Image Zeta Aurigae

K-type bright giants
B-type main-sequence stars
Eclipsing binaries
Algol variables

Auriga (constellation)
Aurigae, Zeta
Durchmusterung objects
Aurigae, 08
032068
023453
1612
Sadatoni